Mongolia has submitted films for the Academy Award for Best International Feature Film since 2003. The award is handed out annually by the United States Academy of Motion Picture Arts and Sciences to a feature-length motion picture produced outside the United States that contains primarily non-English dialogue.

Mongolia has submitted five films for consideration, although none have been nominated for the Foreign Film Oscar. However, The Story of the Weeping Camel submitted itself for the Academy Award for Best Documentary (Feature) the following year and was nominated. The first two Mongolian submissions were German co-productions, directed or co-directed by Byambasuren Davaa and were filmed in Mongolian.

Submissions
Every year, each country is invited by the Academy of Motion Picture Arts and Sciences to submit its best film for the Academy Award for Best Foreign Language Film. The Foreign  Language Film Award Committee oversees the process and reviews all the submitted films. Following this, they vote via secret ballot to determine the five nominees for the award. Below is a list of the films that have been submitted by Mongolia for review by the Academy for the award.

{|class="wikitable sortable" width="98%" style="background:#ffffff;"
|-
! Year(Ceremony) !! Film title used in nomination !! Mongolian title !! Director !! Result
|-
| align="center" | 2003(76th)
| The Story of the Weeping Camel
| Ингэний Нулимс
| Byambasuren Davaa and Luigi Falorni
| 
|-
| align="center" | 2005(78th)
| The Cave of the Yellow Dog
| Шар Нохойн Агуй
| Byambasuren Davaa
| 
|-
| align="center" | 2009(82nd)
| By the Will of Genghis Khan
| Тайна Чингис Хаана
| Andrei Borissov
| 
|-
| align="center" | 2017(90th)
| The Children of Genghis
| Чингисийн хүүхдүүд
| Zolbayar Dorj
| 
|-
| align="center" | 2019(92nd)
| The Steed
| Морь
| Erdenebileg Ganbold
| 
|-
| align="center" | 2020(92nd)
| Veins of the World
| Дэлхийн судлууд
| Byambasuren Davaa
| 
|-
| align="center" | 2022(95th)
| Harvest Moon
| Эргэж ирэхгүй намар
| Amarsaikhan Baljinnyam
| 
|}

The first two Mongolian submissions concerned the lives of rural families on the Mongolian steppe, and the closely intertwined life of people and their animals. Both films contained elements of documentary and fiction and used real Mongolian families as their actors. In Weeping Camel, a family attempts to reconcile a mother camel who refuses to nurse its newborn calf, with a traditional musical ritual. In Yellow Dog'', a little girl tries to convince her reluctant family to adopt a wild dog.

See also
List of Academy Award winners and nominees for Best Foreign Language Film
List of Academy Award-winning foreign language films
Cinema of Mongolia

Notes

References

External links
The Official Academy Awards Database
The Motion Picture Credits Database
IMDb Academy Awards Page

Mongolia

Academy Award for Best Foreign Language Film